Stomopteryx luticoma is a moth of the family Gelechiidae. It was described by Edward Meyrick in 1929. It is found in southern India.

The wingspan is about 14 mm. The forewings are dark fuscous, speckled with grey whitish  The plical and second discal stigmata are very obscurely blackish, edged with some whitish scales posteriorly. The hindwings are grey.

References

Moths described in 1929
Stomopteryx